Rachel Crow is the debut extended play (EP) by The X Factor season one finalist Rachel Crow. The EP was released on June 26, 2012, by Syco Music and Columbia Records.

Background
Crow announced via Twitter that she would be releasing a five-song EP in June 2012, featuring one song co-written by Crow herself. She later announced via her website that it would be released on June 26, 2012, and will be self-titled. The lead single is "Mean Girls," which Crow co-wrote with Toby Gad. Gad also produced the song. The four other songs are "Rock with You" featuring rapper Mann, "Lemonade," "My Kind of Wonderful" and "What a Song Can Do." She has also worked with producer Jonas Jeberg, who has worked with singers such as The Wanted.

Track listing

Charts

References

2012 EPs
Columbia Records EPs